This is a list of Dutch exonyms for towns located in France.

Département Nord 
 Armbouts-Cappel		Armboutskappel
 Armentières		Armentiers
 Arnèke			Arneke
 Bac-de-Millam		?
 Bailleul	Belle
 Bambecque			Bambeke
 Bavinchove		Bavinkhove
 Benkies-Meulen		Benkies-Meulen
 Bergues			Sint-Winoksbergen
 Berthen			Berten
 Bierne			Bieren
 Bissezeele		Bissezele
 Blaringhem		Blaringem
 Boeschepe			Boeschepe
 Boëseghem			Boezegem
 Bollezeele		Bollezele
 Booneghem			Boonegem
 Borre		Borre
 Bourbourg			Broekburg
 Bousbecque		Boesbeke
 Bray-Dunes		Bray Duinen
 Brouckerque		Broekkerke
 Broxeele			Broksele
 Buysscheure		Buisscheure
 Caëstre			Kaaster
 Calicanes			?
 Capelle-Brouck		Kapellebroek
 Cappelle-la-Grande	Grootkappel
 Cassel	Kassel
 Comines	Komen
 Coppenaxfort		Koppenaksvoort
 Coudekerque-Branche	Nieuw Koudekerke
 Coudekerque-Village	Koudekerke
 Craywick			Kraaiwijk
 Crochte			Krochte
 Croix-du-Bac		Kruis van Bac
 Drincham			Drinkam
 Droogland			Droogland
 Dunkerque		Duinkerke
 Ebblinghem		Ebblingem
 Eecke			Eke
 Eringhem			Eringem
 Erquinghem-Lys		Erkegem a.d. Leie
 Escobecques		Schobeke
 Esquelbecq		Ekelsbeke
 Estaires			Stegers
 Flêtre			Vleteren
 Frelinghien		Verlegem
 Ghyvelde			Gijvelde
 Godewaersvelde		Godewaarsvelde
 Grande-Synthe		Groot Sinten
 Grand-Fort-Philippe	Groot Filipsfort
 Grand-Millebrugghe	Groot Millebrugge
 Gravelines		Gravelingen
 Haeghe-Meulen		Haage-Meulen
 Haezepoel			Hazepoel
 Halluin			Halewijn
 Hameau-des-Neiges		Sneeuw Hamlet
 Hardifort			Hardevoort
 Haverskerque		Haverskerke
 Hazebrouck		Hazebroek
 Herzeele			Herzele
 Holque			Holke
 Hondeghem			Hondegem
 Hondschoote		Hondschoote
 Houtkerque		Houtkerke
 Hoymille			Hooimille
 Killem			Killem
 Killem-Linde		Killem-Linde
 Kromen-Hoek		Kroemenhoek
 Kruysweg			Kruisweg
 L’Erkelsbrugge		Erkelsbrugge
 L’Hossenaere		Hossenaare
 La Belle-Vue		Mooi-Zicht
 La Brouckstraete		Broekstraat
 La Gorgue			De Gorge
 La Kruystraete		Kruisstraat
 La-Motte-au-Bois		De Walle
 Le Cygne			De Swaan
 Le Galghouck		Galghoek
 Le Guindal		Guindaal
 Le Kieken-Put		Kiekenput
 Le Menegat		Menegat
 Le Nieppe			De Niepe
 Le Peckel			Peckel
 Le Riveld			Rieveld
 Le Sart			?
 Le Sprey			De Spreuk
 Le Thieushoek		Thuishoek
 Lederzeele		Lederzele
 Ledinghem			Ledringem
 Ledringhem		Ledringem
 Leffinckoucke		Leffinkhoeke
 Leffinckoucke-Village	Leffinkhoeke-Dorp
 Les Ciseaux		Schaar
 Les Moëres		De Moeren
 Lestrem			Lestrem
 Lille			Rijsel
 Linselles			Linzele
 Looberghe			Loberge
 Loon-Plage		Loon
 Lynck			Lijnk
 Lynde			Linde
 Malo-les-Bains		Malo
 Mardyck			Mardijk
 Merckeghem	        Merckegem
 Merris			?
 Merville	Meregem
 Méteren			Meteren
 Meulhouck			Meulhoek
 Millam			Millam
 Mont-d’Halluin		Halewijn-Berg
 Morbecque			Moerbeke
 Neuf-Berquin		Nieuw Berkijk
 Nieppe			Niepkerke
 Nieurlet			Nieuwerleet
 Noordpeene		Noordpene
 Ochtezeele		Ochtezele
 Oost-Cappel		Oostkappel
 Oudezeele			Oudezele
 Outtersteene		Oudersteene
 Oxelaëre			Okselare
 Petite-Synthe		Klein Sinten
 Petit-Millebrugghe	Klein Millebrugge
 Petit-Fort-Philippe	Klein Filipsfort
 Pitgam			?
 Pont-d’Asquin		Askuin Brug
 Pont-de-Spyker		Spijkerbrugge
 Pont-l’Ablesse		Zwakte Brug
 Pradelles	Pradeels
 Quaëdypre			Kwaadieper
 Quathove			Kwaadhove
 Quesnoy-les-Deule		Kiezenet
 Rattekot			Rattekot
 Renescure			Ruisscheure
 Rexpoëde			Rekspoede
 Riet-Veld			Rietveld
 Roncq			Ronk
 Rosendaël			Rozendaal
 Rubrouck			Rubroek
 Ruth		Rut
 Sainte-Marie-Cappel	Sint-Mariakappel
 Sainte-Mildrède		Sint-Mildred
 Saint-Georges		Sint-Joris
 Saint-Jans-Cappel		Sint-Janskappel
 Saint-Laurent		Sint-Lorens
 Saint-Momelin		Sint-Momelijn
 Saint-Pierre-Brouck	Sint-Pietersbroek
 Saint-Pol-sur-Mer		Sint-Pols
 Schoubrouck		Schouwbroek
 Sec-Bois			Droogbos
 Sercus			Zerkel
 Socx			Soks
 Spreuwkoot		Spreuwkoot
 Spycker			Spijker
 Steenbecque		Steenbeke
 Steene			Stene
 Steentje			Steentje
 Steenvoorde		Steenvoorde
 Steenwerck		Steenwerk
 Strazeele			Strazele
 Tannay	?
 Terdeghem			Terdegem
 Téteghem			Tetegem
 Thiennes			Tienen
 Tiegerveld		Tiegerveld
 Uxem			Uksem
 Vancauwenberghe		Vancauwenberge
 Verlinghem		Verlingem
 Vieux-Berquin		Oud Berkijk
 Volckerinckhove		Volkerinkhove
 Wallon-Cappel		Waalskappel
 Warhem			Warrem
 Watten	Waten
 Wattendam			Watendam
 Wemaers-Cappel		Wemaarskappel
 Wervicq-Sud		Wervik (Zuid)
 West-Cappel		Westkappel
 Winnezeele		Winnezele
 Wormhout			Wormhout
 Wulverdinghe		Wulverdinge
 Wylder			Wilder
 Zegerscappel		Zegerskappel
 Zuydcoote			Zuidkote
 Zuytpeene			Zuidpene

Département Pas-de-Calais 
 Arras Atrecht
 Audrehem		Ouderem
 Audricq		Ouderwijk
 Bayenghem		Baaiengem
 Boulogne-sur-mer Bonen
 Bouvelinghem	Bouvelingem
 Calais		Kales
 Éperlecques	Sperleke
 Escalles Skale 
 Étaples Stapel
 Guemps		Gemps
 Le Touquet Het Hoekske
 Mannequebeurre	Manekebeurre
 Muncq-Nieurlet	Munk-Niewerleet
 Nortkerque	Noordkerke
 Nort-Leulinghem	Noord Leulingem
 Nouvelle Église	Nieuwkerke
 Offekerque	Offekerke
 Ostove		Oosthove
 Oye-Plage Ooie
 Recques		Reek
 Saint-Marie-Kerque	Sint Mariakerke
 Saint-Nicolas	Sint Niklaas
 Saint-Omer	Sint Omaars
 Saint-Omer-Plage	Sint Omaars-Strand
 Salperwick	Salperwijk
 Sangatte Zandgat
 Vielle Église	Oudekerke
 Wissant Witzand
 Zutkeque		Zuidkerke

Other areas 
Paris      Parijs
Rouen Rouaan
Strasbourg Straatsburg

See also 
Dutch exonyms
List of European exonyms

Dutch language lists
Dutch
Dutch exonyms in France